This is a list of Iowa county courthouses.  Each county in Iowa has a city that is the county seat where the county government resides, including a county courthouse, except for Lee County, which has two county seats and two county courthouses.

Iowa
Courthouses, county